Abrothallus halei is a species of lichenicolous fungus in the family Abrothallaceae. It was formally described as a new species in 2010 by lichenologists Sergio Pérez-Ortega, Ave Suija, David Leslie Hawksworth, and Rolf Santesson. The fungus has also been collected in West Virginia, Maine, as well as in Norway. The species epithet honours American lichenologist Mason Hale.

References

halei
Fungi described in 2010
Fungi of Europe
Fungi of the United States
Taxa named by David Leslie Hawksworth
Taxa named by Rolf Santesson
Taxa named by Ave Suija